Curious Faces Violet Future is the first EP by American indie rock band Twin Tigers.

Track listing

2008 EPs